Gunnar Östberg (February 4, 1923 – December 25, 2017) was a Swedish cross-country skier who competed in the 1950s. He finished ninth in the 18 km event at the 1952 Winter Olympics in Oslo. He was born in Kramfors, Ångermanland.

References
18 km Olympic cross country results: 1948-52
Gunnar Östberg's profile at the Swedish Olympic Committee 

1923 births
2017 deaths
People from Kramfors Municipality
Cross-country skiers from Västernorrland County
Swedish male cross-country skiers
Olympic cross-country skiers of Sweden
Cross-country skiers at the 1952 Winter Olympics